Train of Thought is an evolving Canadian community arts journey from west to east coast, with on-board activities and over 20 stops along the way. Train of Thought is produced by Toronto's Jumblies Theatre with partners all across Canada and will be taking place May and June 2015.

History 

Train of Thought was hatched by a group of artists sharing community engagement practices and projects across the country. Its focus is collaborations and alliances between First Nations and settler/immigrant artists and communities.

Themes 

In developing the idea for Train of Thought, Jumblies Theatre and partners asked what theme merited such a huge cross-country undertaking, a question that led to a focus on collaborations and alliances between First Nations and settler/immigrant artists and communities: the most challenging and urgent matter that all of us are grappling with and learning about from our different regional and cultural perspectives. Thus, Train of Thought takes a counter-colonial route to collect and share stories, buried histories and imagined landscapes of the land where we live: as it might have been, as it is, as it could be: drawing on perception, memory, history and imagination; merging whimsy and serious intent, bringing together artists and community members, the land's first people and all those who have found refuge here over the years and generations.

Production 

Train of Thought is an evolving community arts journey from west to east coast, with on-board activities and over stops along the way. At each stop, a travelling company will get off until the next train comes through. Local arts organizations will host interactive events, and add to creative tasks. Additional travellers will hop aboard to join in conversations and art-making en route.

Purpose 

Train of Thought is less about trains than about the relationships and discoveries that the journey will enable. The tour is an imperfect and incomplete adventure - part of a longer and unending imperative to learn, connect and help to change tracks.

Route 
British Columbia
 Victoria partnered with From the Heart
 Vancouver partnered with Vancouver Moving Theatre, Vancouver Parks Board, Round House Community Centre
 Enderby partnered with Runaway Moon Theatre

Prairie Provinces
 Edmonton, Alberta partnered with Rising Sun Theatre Society, Ground Zero Productions, and the Edmonton Community Arts Network
 Saskatoon, Saskatchewan partnered with Common Weal Community Arts
 Winnipeg, Manitoba partnered with ACI Manitoba and Urban Indigenous Theatre Co.

Ontario
 Sioux Lookout partnered with Municipality of Sioux Lookout
 Kenora partnered with Kenora Association for Community Living and the Community Arts Hub
 Thunder Bay partnered with CAHEP
 North Bay partnered with White Water Gallery and Aanmitaagzi Storymakers 
 Manitoulin Island partnered with Debajehmujig Storytellers
 Blind River partnered with Thinking Rock Community Arts and AlgomaTrad
 Sudbury partnered with Myths and Mirrors
 Toronto partnered with Arts4All, MABELLEarts, Making Room, Community Arts Guild, Red Dress Productions, The Mississauga Arts Council, CityPlace Railway Lands Resident Group, and The Amy Project
 Windsor/Brantford partnered with Arts Council Windsor and Region
 Kingston partnered with Stage and Screen Studies (Queen's University)
 Ottawa/Killaloe partnered with Ottawa Valley Creative Arts Open Studio, Carlington Art Initiative, and Canada's Magnetic North Festival

Quebec
 Montreal partnered with Contactivity Senior Centre, NDG Senior Citizen's Council, Concordia Theatre and Development, RECCA, Art Hives/ Ruches D'Art

Maritime Provinces
 Halifax, Nova Scotia partnered with Halifax Circus School, 4 C's Foundation, and Wonder'neath
 Ship Harbour, Nova Scotia partnered with The Deanery Project
 Rock Barra, Prince Edward Island partnered with Rock Barra Retreat

External links 

http://www.jumbliestheatre.org
http://www.trainofthought.co
http://www.cbc.ca/news/follow-this-train-of-thought-1.3087206?cmp=rss
http://rabble.ca/news/2015/06/art-on-move-train-thought-explores-treaties-and-decolonization-cities-across-canada
http://www.queensjournal.ca/story/2015-06-28/arts/train-of-thought-stops-in-kingston/
http://dreambignorth.com/trainofthought/
http://www.straight.com/arts/444391/cultures-connect-tracks
http://www.shaw.ca/shawtv/vancouver/goWestCoast/
http://www.nsnews.com/entertainment/dossier/tracks-symposium-serves-up-a-cultural-feast-1.192875
https://soundcloud.com/cjsrfm/all-that-matters-preaching-to-the-choir
http://m.chroniclejournal.com/news/local/having-a-train-of-thought/article_94a4a1d6-0427-11e5-bf44-0f0250a82801.html?mode=jqm
http://www.cfrc.ca/program_archive
http://ici.radio-canada.ca/emissions/pour_faire_un_monde/2014-2015/index.asp
http://www.timescolonist.com/news/local/train-journey-aims-to-spark-first-nations-dialogue-1.1874292
http://www.northernlife.ca/news/localNews/2015/06/06-water-ceremony-sudbury.asp
http://anishinabeknews.ca/2015/06/03/dont-give-up-dream-big/

Arts festivals in Canada
2015 in Canada